The Strongest-K Championship was the top singles title in Kaientai Dojo and was established in 2004. The holder of the title was referred to as the "Champion of Strongest-K". There have been a total of 27 reigns and one vacancy shared between 16 different champions. The final title holder was Ayato Yoshida.

Title history

Reigns

Combined reigns
 , .

{| class="wikitable sortable" style="text-align: center"
!Rank
!Wrestler
!No. ofreigns
!Combineddefenses
!Combineddays
|-
!1
| Kengo Mashimo || 6 || 34 || 1,965
|-
!2
| Yuji Hino || 4 || 9 || 724
|-
!3
| Taka Michinoku || 2 || 12 || 549
|-
!4
| Taishi Takizawa || 2 || 6 || 534
|-
!5
| Tank Nagai || 2 || 6 || 356
|-
!6
| Kazma || 1 || 5 || 301
|-
!7
| Joe || 1 || 3 || 276
|-
!8
| Kaz Hayashi || 1 || 2 || 121
|-
!9
| Isami Kodaka || 1 || 2 || 113
|-
!10
| Daisuke Sekimoto || 1 || 3 || 83
|-
!11
| Shu Asakawa || 1 || 2 || 90
|- 
!rowspan=2|12
| Hi69 || 1 || 1 || 70
|-
| Saburo Inematsu || 1 || 1 || 70
|-
!14
| Miyawaki || 1 || 1 || 63
|-
!15
| Ayato Yoshida || 1 || 0 || 43
|-
!16
| Kaji Tomato || 1 || 0 || 20

References

Active Advance Pro Wrestling championships